The Silverband Falls are waterfalls located in the Grampians National Park, in western Victoria, Australia. Fed by Dairy Creek, the horsetail falls are characterised by a narrow band of water that tumbles over a small rock face and then disappears into a rocky base.

Early European visitors to the falls named it Silverband because of its narrow stream of water.

See also

 List of waterfalls of Victoria

References

External links 
 Parks Victoria: Grampians National Park

Waterfalls of Victoria (Australia)
Tourist attractions in Victoria (Australia)
Grampians (national park)
Horsetail waterfalls